The VRC C.B. Fisher Plate was a weight-for-age thoroughbred horse race over 2400 metres (a mile and a half). It was run at Flemington Racecourse, Melbourne Australia on the Saturday after the Melbourne Cup in early November from 1870 till 1978. It is no longer held.

The notable winners were Amounis (1929), Eurythmic (1920), Phar Lap (1930), Ajax (1939), Rising Fast (1955), Tulloch (1957), Even Stevens (1962), and Galilee (1966).

References

Charles Brown Fisher was a noted horse breeder of the late 19th century.
Horse races in Australia